The Generative Economy is a term coined by Marjorie Kelly to define "a living economy that is designed to generate the conditions for life to thrive, an economy with a built-in tendency to be socially fair and ecologically sustainable."

Generative economy attempts to reorganize the purpose and structure of an organization, to the extent of being self-organized around serving the needs of life. Generative economy claims to be based on designs that are rich in biodiversity, not monoculture. Examples of these types of organizational designs are employee ownerships, cooperatives, credit unions, community land trusts, co-housing communities, community wind, family-owned businesses, and foundations-owned companies (common in Northern Europe). Its goals are to create fair and just outcomes, benefit the many rather than the few, and enable an enduring human presence on the planet Earth. The generative (living) model is meant to contrast with the extractive (financial) model that fueled nations through industrialization; it is a postindustrial philosophy
, and an alternative to conventional currency.

Controversy
Generative economy is arguably a better approach to the outdated extractive economy, but the transition to such a model must attempt to anticipate the difficulty in transforming participants behavior, such that living goals are prioritized and financial goals are not prioritized. It may be possible, albeit unlikely, that living and financial goals are not conflicting in the long-run for the majority of Earth's human population.

References

Environmental economics